Arizona State Prison Complex – Winslow is one of 13 prison facilities operated by the Arizona Department of Corrections (ADC). ASPC-Winslow is located in Winslow, Navajo County, Arizona, 203 miles northwest from the state capital of Phoenix, Arizona. 

ASPC-Winslow includes a minimum security unit near St Johns and has an inmate capacity of approximately 1,928 in 3 housing units  and 2 special housing units at security levels 2, 4, and 5. The ADC uses a score classification system to assess inmates appropriate custody and security level placement. The scores range from 1 to 5 with 5 being the highest risk or need. ASPC-Winslow medium to high security prison.

See also 
List of U.S. state prisons
List of Arizona state prisons

External links 
Arizona Department of Corrections

Winslow
Buildings and structures in Navajo County, Arizona
Winslow, Arizona